Eduardo Marquina (21 January 1879 – 21 November 1946) was a Spanish playwright and poet associated with the Catalan Modernist school.
His En Flandes se ha puesto el Sol (The Sun Has Set in Flanders) was awarded the Royal Spanish Academy's award for historical drama. He also wrote lyrics for the Spanish anthem Marcha Real, used during the reign of Alfonso XII.

Selected filmography
 The Nail (1944)
 Thirsty Land  (1945)

1879 births
1946 deaths
Catalan dramatists and playwrights
Spanish people of the Spanish Civil War (National faction)
Poets from Catalonia